James R. Rasband (born March 20, 1963) has been a general authority of the Church of Jesus Christ of Latter-day Saints (LDS Church) since April 2019. He was previously the Academic Vice President (AVP) at Brigham Young University (BYU) from June 2017 until shortly after he was called as a general authority. He also previously served as dean of the J. Reuben Clark Law School (JRCLS). He has also been the Hugh W. Colton Professor of Law.

Legal and academic career
Rasband received a bachelor's degree from BYU (1986) and later graduated from Harvard Law School (1989), where he was an editor of the Harvard Law Review.

Following law school, Rasband clerked for Judge J. Clifford Wallace of the United States Court of Appeals for the Ninth Circuit. He then worked as a lawyer in Seattle for the Perkins Coie law firm.  In 1995, he joined the faculty of the JRCLS. He has been a visiting professor in Australia at the University of Queensland and Murdoch University. Rasband is a specialist in public land law and natural resources law.

From 2004 to 2008, Rasband served as Associate Dean of Academic Affairs at the JRCLS. In 2008 and 2009, he was BYU's Associate AVP for Faculty. Rasband served as dean of the JRCLS from 2009 to 2016.

Rasband was succeeded as BYU's AVP by C. Shane Reese.

LDS Church service
As a young man, Rasband was a full-time missionary in the church's Seoul Korea Mission. He served in the church as president of the Provo Utah YSA 8th Stake from 2011 to 2016. In April 2017, he was called as an area seventy. Rasband was sustained as a General Authority Seventy on April 6, 2019, at age 56. Since August 2020, Rasband has been serving as a counselor in the presidency of the church's Asia North Area.

Personal life
Rasband and his wife, Mary Williams, are the parents of four children.

References

Additional reading
BYU bio of Rasband
BYU news announcement of Rasband's appointment as dean of the J. Reuben Clark Law School
"New dean for BYU Law School", Church News, April 21, 2009

External links
General Authorities and General Officers: Elder James Rasband

1963 births
Living people
American general authorities (LDS Church)
Brigham Young University faculty
Brigham Young University alumni
Harvard Law School alumni
Latter Day Saints from Utah
Latter Day Saints from Massachusetts
Latter Day Saints from Washington (state)
General authority seventies (LDS Church)
American Mormon missionaries in South Korea
People associated with Perkins Coie